Abigail Smith is a professor in marine sciences at Otago University in Dunedin.

Smith grew up in Maine and did her undergraduate studies at Colby College and Massachusetts Institute of Technology before emigrating to New Zealand to study for a PhD at Waikato University with a thesis entitled 'Aspects of the sedimentology of New Zealand bryozoans and mixed carbonate-clastic deposits : a contribution to the temperate shelf carbonate model.'

Smith's research relates to the formation of skeletons' marine micro-flora and their deposition on the seafloor as sediment.

In October 2019, Smith won the Miriam Dell Award for Excellence in Science Mentoring from the Association for Women in Science.

References

External links
 institutional homepage

Living people
New Zealand women academics
Academic staff of the University of Otago
University of Waikato alumni
Year of birth missing (living people)
American emigrants to New Zealand
Scientists from Maine
Colby College alumni
Massachusetts Institute of Technology alumni